Ajvaagiin Danzan (1895–1932), also known as Japan Danzan or Little Danzan, was chairman of Mongolian People's Revolutionary Party (MPRP) from January 2, 1923, to August 31, 1924.

Born to peasant parents in Tüsheet Khan Province (present day east central Mongolia) in 1895, Danzan traveled to Japan in 1916, thus earning the moniker he carried later in life to distinguish him from his contemporary namesake, party leader Soliin Danzan. He joined the Mongolian People's Party in 1921, was elected vice-chairman of the party central committee from 1922 to 1923, and then chairman from 1923 to 1924. Danzan was party chairman during the Third Party Congress in 1924 that saw the purge and execution of former party chairman Soliin Danzan.  After serving again as party deputy chairman from 1924 to 1925, he became a diplomatic envoy with postings in Soviet Russia (1925-1926) and then to China (Beijing, Shanghai, Tianjin, Nanjing, and Harbin) from 1926 to 1928. From 1929 to 1931, he worked at the Institute of Manuscripts alongside Prime Minister Anandyn Amar.

In 1932, Danzan was caught up in a widescale purge of suspected rightwingers (mostly politicians who voiced concerns with growing Soviet influence in Mongolia) that included Jamsrangiin Tseveen, Tseren-Ochiryn Dambadorj, and Navaandorjiin Jadambaa. Danzan was arrested and charged with counterrevolution for allegedly collaborating with Japanese intelligence as his nickname suggested. He died in prison in 1932 before going to trial.

References

1895 births
1924 deaths
Mongolian communists
Mongolian People's Party politicians
Mongolian people who died in prison custody
Prisoners who died in Mongolian detention